Itikyala is a Mandal in Jogulamba Gadwal district, Telangana, India.

Institutions
 Zilla Parishad High School
 Kottam Manikyamma Junior College
 There is a Railway station in Itikyal under South Central Railway.
 Keshava Reddy English medium school in Konderu.
 9th AP Special police Battalion.
 Beechupally Anjaneya swami Temple, Beechupally.

Villages
The villages in Itikyal mandal include:
 Batladinne 	
 Beechupally
 Chagapoor 	
 Darmavaram 	
 Gopaldinne 	
 Itikyal 
 Jinkalapally	
 Kodandapuram 	
 Kondair
 Munagala 	
 Nakkalapally 	
 Peddadinne 	
 Putandoddy 	
 Rajasri Garlapad 
 Ravulachervu	
 Sasanool 	
 Saterla 	
 Shabad
 Shaikpally 
 Shivanampally
 Thimmapur 	
 Udandapuram 	
 Vallur 	
 Vavilala 	
 Vemula

References

Villages in Jogulamba Gadwal district